The Romanian People's Salvation Cross is a monumental cross in Nisporeni, Moldova.

Constructuion

The monumental cross is illuminated by LEDs during night and is visible at tens of kilometers. 

The monument was opened on August 28, 2011 by Petru, the Metropolitan of Bessarabia, Teofan Savu (Archbishop of Iaşi and Metropolitan of Moldova and Bucovina), and Corneliu Bârlădeanul Onila (Vicar Archprelate of the Bishopric of Huşi). More than 800 participants joined the opening ceremony on August 28, 2011, among them being Mihai Ghimpu, Marius Lazurcă, Dorin Chirtoacă, Ion Ungureanu, Valeriu Saharneanu, Veaceslav Ţâbuleac, Vasile Adam.  The Monument is located near Vărzăreşti Monastery.

The Romanian People's Salvation Cross was built by public subscription which cost 1,300,000 lei. A book, containing over 200 pages and about 100 color photographs, recorded all those who contributed to the monument project.

See also
Monuments and memorials in Moldova
Trinitas Cross

References

Bibliography
 Maria Dohotaru, Crucea Mântuirii Neamului Românesc de la Nisporeni, Basarabia, Editura Magic Print, Oneşti, 2012.}

External links
 Moldova 1, TRM Crucea mântuirii neamului Românesc 
 Pro TV, Crucea Mantuirii Neamului Romanesc s-a inaltat la Nisporeni 
 Adevărul Moldova, La Nisporeni a fost sfinţită „Crucii Mântuirii Neamului Românesc” 
 Ziarul de Gardă, Crucea Mântuirii Neamului a fost instalată la Nisporeni 
 Unimedia, Crucea Mântuirii Neamului Românesc înălțată la Nisporeni
 Timpul, Sculptorul Vasile Adam: „Noi obişnuim să vedem lucrurile cu ochiul al treilea…”

Monumental crosses
Monuments and memorials in Moldova
Nisporeni
Chapels in Moldova
2011 sculptures
Buildings and structures completed in 2011
2011 establishments in Moldova
Tourist attractions in Moldova